Pilot Officer Rashid Minhas  was a Pakistani pilot in the Pakistan Air Force. Minhas was the only PAF officer to receive the highest valour award, the Nishan-e-Haider. He was also the youngest person and the shortest-serving officer to have received this award. During the routine training mission in August 1971, Minhas attempted to gain control of his jet trainer when his superior officer Flight Lieutenant Matiur Rahman hijacked his plane and was trying to defect to India to join the Liberation war of Bangladesh which then crashed near the Thatta District, Sindh in Pakistan.

Biography
Rashid Minhas was born on 17 February 1951, in Karachi to a Punjabi Muslim Rajput family of the Minhas clan. Rashid Minhas spent his early childhood in Karachi. Later, the family shifted to Rawalpindi, and shifted back to Karachi. Minhas was fascinated with aviation history and technology. He used to collect different models of aircraft and jets. He also attended St Patrick's High School, Karachi.

The ancestors of Rashid Minhas were born in Qila Sobha Singh, Punjab and later on they moved to Karachi and Rashid Minhas was born in Karachi. His father, Majeed Minhas, a civil engineer and an alumnus of the NED University in Karachi, was in a construction management business who later moved to Lahore, Punjab, for the construction project. He was educated in Lahore and took admission in the British-managed St. Mary's School in Rawalpindi when his father found an employment opportunity. But later they permanently settled in Karachi.

He passed and qualified for his Senior Cambridge examination and performed well while finishing the O-level and A-level qualifications from the St. Patrick's High School. His father, Majeed Minhas, wanted his son, Rashid, to follow his step by attending the engineering university and strongly desired for his son to gain a degree in engineering after finishing his high schooling in Karachi. Against the wishes of his father, Rashid entered in the PAF School in Lower Topa in 1968, the Air Force's officer candidate school, and forwarded towards completing his military training at the Pakistan Air Force Academy in 1969.

Death
Having joined the air force, Minhas was commissioned on 13 March 1971, in the 51st GD(P) Course. He began training to become a pilot. On 20 August of that year, in the hour before noon, he was getting ready to take off in a T-33 jet trainer in Karachi, Pakistan.

His second solo flight in that type of aircraft. Minhas was taxiing toward the runway when a Bengali instructor pilot, Flight Lieutenant Matiur Rahman, signalled him to stop and then climbed into the instructor's seat. The jet took off and Rahman turned towards India.

Minhas radioed PAF Base Masroor with the message that he was being hijacked. The air controller requested that he resend his message and he confirmed the hijacking. Later investigation showed that Rahman intended to defect to India to join his compatriots in the Bangladesh Liberation War, along with the jet trainer. In the air, Minhas struggled physically to wrest control from Rahman; both men tried to overpower the other through the mechanically linked flight controls. Some  from the Indian border, the jet crashed near Thatta. Both men were killed.

Minhas was posthumously awarded Pakistan's top military honour, the Nishan-e-Haider, and became the youngest man and the only member of the Pakistan Air Force to win the award. Similarly, Rahman was honoured by Bangladesh with their highest military award, the Bir Sreshtho.

Minhas's Pakistan military citation for the Nishan-e-Haider states that he "forced the aircraft to crash" to prevent Rahman from taking the jet to India. This is the official, popular and widely known version of how Minhas died. Yawar A. Mazhar, a writer for Pakistan Military Consortium, relayed in 2004 that he spoke to retired PAF Group Captain Cecil Chaudhry about Minhas and that he learned more details not generally known to the public. According to Mazhar, Chaudhry led the immediate task of investigating the wreckage and writing the accident report. Chaudhry told Mazhar that he found the jet had hit the ground nose first, instantly killing Minhas in the front seat. Rahman's body, however, was not in the jet and the canopy was missing. Chaudhry searched the area and saw Rahman's body some distance behind the jet, the body found with severe abrasions from hitting the sand at a low angle and a high speed. Chaudhry thought that Minhas probably jettisoned the canopy at low altitude causing Rahman to be thrown from the cockpit because he was not strapped in. Chaudhry felt that the jet was too close to the ground at that time, too far out of control for Minhas to be able to prevent the crash.

Legacy 
After his death, Minhas was honoured as a national hero. In his memory, the Pakistan Air Force base at Kamra was renamed PAF Base Minhas, often called Minhas-Kamra. In Karachi he was honoured by the naming of a main road, 'Rashid Minhas Road'. A two-rupee postage stamp bearing his image was issued by Pakistan Post in December 2003; 500,000 were printed.

Awards and decorations

See also 
 Major Aziz Bhatti
 Squadron leader Sarfaraz Ahmed Rafiqui

References

External links
Pilot-Officer Rashid Minhas at Pakistan Army website

1951 births
1971 deaths
Punjabi people
St. Patrick's High School, Karachi alumni
University of Karachi alumni
Pakistan Air Force Academy alumni
Pakistan Air Force officers
People of the Bangladesh Liberation War
Pakistani military personnel killed in action
Military personnel from Karachi
Recipients of Nishan-e-Haider